Final Cut is a 1980 Australian thriller film directed by Ross Dimsey. It was the first movie funded by the Queensland Film Corporation, who provided half the budget. The Australian Film Commission and private investment provided the rest of the finance. It was originally envisioned as a tele movie but then developed into a feature.

It was shot at Surfers' Paradise.

References

External links

Final Cut at Oz Movies

Australian thriller films
1980 films
1980s English-language films
1980s Australian films